Vladislav Olegovich Lyovin (born 28 March 1995) is a Russian professional football player. He plays for 1. FC Slovácko.

Club career
He made his professional debut on 29 August 2015 for FC Dynamo Moscow in a Russian Football Premier League game against FC Ufa.

On 7 February 2017, he moved to the Czech Republic, signing with FK Mladá Boleslav.

Personal life
His father Oleg Lyovin played football professionally for FC Oryol and other third-tier Russian Professional Football League teams.

References

External links
 
 
 

1995 births
Sportspeople from Oryol
Living people
Russian footballers
Association football midfielders
FC Dynamo Moscow players
Russian Premier League players
Russian expatriate footballers
Expatriate footballers in the Czech Republic
FK Mladá Boleslav players
Czech First League players
FC Vysočina Jihlava players
Bohemians 1905 players
1. FC Slovácko players
Russian expatriate sportspeople in the Czech Republic